Euphorbia sarawschanica, the Zeravshan spurge, is a species of flowering plant in the family Euphorbiaceae, native to Central Asia. It is a clumping, deciduous herb with narrow, blue-green leaves and greenish-yellow flowers. The Royal Horticultural Society considers it to be a good plant to attract pollinators.

References

sarawschanica
Garden plants of Asia
Flora of Central Asia
Plants described in 1882